The men's 1972 United States Olympic trials for track and field were held from June 29 to July 9 at Hayward Field in Eugene, Oregon, organized by the Amateur Athletic Union (AAU).  These were the first trials with no preliminary events; athletes merely had to meet the qualification standard in their event.  This was also the last time the women's Olympic trials were held separately, and the ten-day competition in Eugene was held over eleven days.

The women's trials were held separately over two days (July 7–8) in Frederick, Maryland, under less elegant conditions at Governor Thomas Johnson High School.  There were no wind readings taken during the events that normally require them; while photo-finish equipment was available in Eugene to separate close finishes, it was not available when needed in Frederick.  As a consequence, the women's 100 meter race had to declare a tie for second place and was only able to assess one hand time for the winner.  Willye White, who qualified for her fifth Olympics at this meet, later complained that "We did poorly at the Olympics because of poor conditions; lack of meets, lack of qualified coaches, and lack of fairness.  For example, the nationals and Olympic trials were conducted on tracks that were not superior, and the team was not in Munich early enough to adjust to the climate and time changes."

The pentathlon took place in New Mexico at Los Alamos on June 23 and 24 and allowed two Canadian athletes to participate.   The Canadian athletes finished in the first two positions but did not displace the selection of the American team.

Men's results
Key:
.

Men track events

Men field events

Notes

Women's results

Women track events

Women field events

External links
Highlights 
Highlights 
Highlights

References

US Olympic Trials
Track, Outdoor
Olympic Trials (track and field)
Olympic Trials (track and field)
Olympic Trials (track and field)
United States Summer Olympics Trials